Ta' Lambert is an airfield on the island of Gozo, Malta. Between June and August 1943, it was used to assist American squadrons in their invasion of Sicily; the invasion code-named Operation Husky.

Construction and Operational History 

The hilly terrain Gozo poses, made the construction of a sufficiently long runway particularly difficult and after consideration the ta' Lambert area was chosen. Within six days the terrain was cleared out from rubble walls, shrubs and famously, Gourgion Tower which was dismantled and never rebuilt. In the process, 300 Gozitan citizens participated in the construction effort, with equipment made available by the American forces. By mid-June two 4000 foot-long compacted soil runways intersecting in a 'Y' shape were built extending from Xewkija to the outskirts of Għajnsielem. Care was immediately taken to install sufficient anti-aircraft artillery units, Bezzina listing stations in Sannat, Ta' Ċenċ, Qala and Xagħra. The runway was considered operational on the 22 of June and on the 23 the first Spitfires landed.

In its short operational history, the aerodrome hosted Spitfires Mk.Vs of the 307, 308 and 309 fighter squadrons under the command of Lt. Col. Fred M. Dean. While not much is known on the day-to-day running of the aerodrome, there was one notable incident. As Edward L. Fardella was landing his Spitfire, he collided into a stationary Spitfire, killing two British commandoes. The pilot survived the incident. Over the span of two months, a total of four US air force pilots had failed to return while on mission from Ta' Lambert.

The prospects of extending the use of the aerodrome through the winter posed its own set of challenges, notably rain which would have made the area too muddy for practical use. By late July 1943 the last Spitfires had departed from the aerodrome, the site falling into disrepair. The fields were later handed back to their owners for cultivation.

References 

World War II airfields
1943 establishments in Malta